Alan Banaszek (born 30 October 1997) is a Polish cyclist, who currently rides for UCI ProTeam . His cousins Adrian Banaszek and Norbert Banaszek are also professional cyclists with the  team.

Major results

Road

2014
 2nd Overall Coupe du Président de la Ville de Grudziądz
1st Stage 4
2015
 1st  Road race, UEC European Junior Road Championships
2016
 4th Puchar Ministra Obrony Narodowej
 6th Overall Dookoła Mazowsza
 6th Münsterland Giro
 10th Road race, UCI Under-23 Road World Championships
2017
 1st International Rhodes Grand Prix
 1st Memorial Grundmanna I Wizowskiego
 1st Memoriał Henryka Łasaka
 Course de la Solidarité Olympique
1st  Points classification
1st Stage 2
 1st Stage 3 CCC Tour – Grody Piastowskie
 2nd Memoriał Romana Siemińskiego
 6th Memoriał Andrzeja Trochanowskiego
 9th Nokere Koerse
2018
 2nd GP Slovakia
 3rd Memoriał Romana Siemińskiego
 10th GP Poland
2020
 1st Grand Prix Side
 1st Stage 1 Tour of Bulgaria
 3rd Grand Prix Gazipasa
 4th Grand Prix Alanya
 8th Overall In the footsteps of the Romans
2021
 1st  Overall Tour of Szeklerland
1st  Points classification
1st Stage 2 
 1st GP Slovakia
 1st Stages 1 & 4 Tour de Serbie
 2nd Road race, National Road Championships
 2nd GP Manavgat
 3rd Grand Prix Gazipaşa
 4th Trofej Umag
 4th Overall Course Cycliste de Solidarnosc et des Champions Olympiques
1st  Points classification
 4th Overall Dookoła Mazowsza
 7th Paris–Chauny
2022
 1st  Overall Tour of Thailand
1st  Points classification
1st Stage 2 
 Belgrade–Banja Luka
1st  Points classification
1st Stages 1 (TTT) & 4
 3rd Overall Dookoła Mazowsza
 4th Overall Tour of Romania
 8th Overall Course de Solidarność et des Champions Olympiques
 9th Memoriał Andrzeja Trochanowskiego

Track

2016
 3rd  Madison (with Daniel Staniszewski), UEC European Under-23 Track Championships
2017
 1st  Points race, UEC European Championships
2019
 National Championships
1st  Points race
1st  Elimination race
2020
 1st  Points race, National Championships
2021
 1st  Omnium, UEC European Championships
 National Championships
1st  Points race
1st  Scratch
1st  Madison (with Daniel Staniszewski)
1st  Omnium
1st  Team pursuit
 2nd Elimination race, UCI Champions League, London

References

External links
 

1997 births
Living people
Polish male cyclists
Polish track cyclists
Cyclists from Warsaw
21st-century Polish people